Fontanella may refer to:

Fontanella, Austria
Fontanella, Lombardy, a comune in the Province of Bergamo, Italy
Nasone, or fontanella, a type of drinking fountain found in Rome, Italy

People with the surname
Francesc Fontanella (1622-1685?), Catalan poet, dramatist, and priest
Mario Fontanella (born 1989), Italian footballer
Vittorio Fontanella (born 1953), Italian middle-distance runner

See also
Fontanelle (disambiguation)
Fontenelle (disambiguation)

Italian-language surnames